Sergio Alfredo Coterón Gonzalo (born July 23, 1961 in Madrid, Spain) is a retired basketball player.

Clubs
1982-84 CB Breogán
1984-85 CB Guadalajara
1985-86 Real Canoe
1986-87 Caixa Ourense
1987-82 Valencia BC
1992-94 CB Gran Canaria

References
 ACB profile

1961 births
Living people
Spanish men's basketball players
Liga ACB players
Valencia Basket players
CB Gran Canaria players
Small forwards
Basketball players from Madrid
CB Breogán players
Real Canoe NC basketball players

Club Ourense Baloncesto players